The 1995 Western Michigan Broncos football team represented Western Michigan University in the Mid-American Conference (MAC) during the 1995 NCAA Division I-A football season.  In their ninth season under head coach Al Molde, the Broncos compiled a 7–4 record (6–2 against MAC opponents), finished in a tie for third place in the MAC, and outscored their opponents, 253 to 190.  The team played its home games at Waldo Stadium in Kalamazoo, Michigan.

The team's statistical leaders included Jay McDonagh with 2,038 passing yards, Jim Vackaro with 702 rushing yards, and Tony Knox with 430 receiving yards.

Schedule

References

Western Michigan
Western Michigan Broncos football seasons
Western Michigan Broncos football